Richard Bassett (April 2, 1745 – September 15, 1815) was an American politician, attorney, slave owner and later abolitionist, veteran of the American Revolution, attorney, signer of the United States Constitution, and one of the Founding Fathers of America. He also served as United States Senator from Delaware, chief justice of the Delaware Court of Common Pleas, governor of Delaware and a United States circuit judge of the United States Circuit Court for the Third Circuit.

Education and career

Born on April 2, 1745, in Cecil County, Province of Maryland, British America, Bassett pursued preparatory studies, then read law. He was admitted to the bar and practiced law in Delaware. By concentrating on agricultural pursuits as well as religious and charitable concerns, he quickly established himself amongst the local gentry and "developed a reputation for hospitality and philanthropy." He was a member of the Delaware constitutional conventions of 1776 and 1792. He was a member of the Council of Safety in Dover, Delaware from 1776 to 1786. He served in the Delaware State Militia as a company captain of the Dover Light Horse Regiment from 1777 to 1781. He was a member of the Delaware Legislative Council (now the Delaware Senate) in 1782. He was a member of the Delaware House of Representatives in 1786. He was a delegate to the Constitutional Convention in 1787, and was a signer of the United States Constitution. He was a member of the Delaware convention which ratified the United States Constitution in 1787. He was in private practice in Wilmington, Delaware from 1787 to 1789.

Bassett was elected to the United States Senate from Delaware and served from March 4, 1789, to March 3, 1793, first as a member of the Anti-Administration Party and later as a member of the Pro-Administration Party. Bassett was chief justice of the Delaware Court of Common Pleas from 1793 to 1799. He was governor of Delaware from 1799 to 1801.

Bassett was nominated by President John Adams on February 18, 1801, to the United States Circuit Court for the Third Circuit, to a new seat authorized by 2 Stat. 89. He was confirmed by the United States Senate on February 20, 1801, and received his commission the same day. His service terminated on July 1, 1802, due to abolition of the court.

Later life and death

After leaving the federal bench, Bassett became a planter in Cecil County.

While he was a slave owner, after converting to Methodism in the 1780s, he freed his slaves and campaigned for the state of Delaware to abolish slavery.

He died on September 15, 1815, on his estate Bohemia Manor in Cecil County. He was initially interred in Cecil County, and in 1865 his remains were re-interred in Wilmington and Brandywine Cemetery in Wilmington, Delaware.

Legacy

Bassett was the grandfather of Richard H. Bayard and James A. Bayard Jr., both United States senators from Delaware.

Bassett Street in Madison, Wisconsin, is named in Bassett's honor.

Bassettown, now Washington, Pennsylvania, was named in Bassett's honor by his cousin David Hoge.

Note

References

Sources

Images
 National Portrait Gallery; portrait courtesy of the National Portrait Gallery.

External links
 
 Biographical Directory of the Governors of the United States

 Biography by Russell Pickett
 Delaware’s Governors
 The Political Graveyard
 Judges of the United States Courts
 National Archives
 Biography of Bassett  in Soldier-Statesman of the Constitution at the United States Army Center of Military History

1745 births
1815 deaths
Founding Fathers of the United States
People from Cecil County, Maryland
People of colonial Maryland
People of colonial Delaware
Signers of the United States Constitution
Anti-Administration Party United States senators from Delaware
Pro-Administration Party United States senators from Delaware
Delaware Federalists
Governors of Delaware
Federalist Party state governors of the United States
Members of the Delaware House of Representatives
Delaware state senators
Delaware Court of Common Pleas judges
Judges of the United States circuit courts
United States federal judges appointed by John Adams
Delaware lawyers
American slave owners
People from Dover, Delaware
19th-century American politicians
18th-century American judges
19th-century American judges
Delaware militiamen in the American Revolution
Burials at Wilmington and Brandywine Cemetery
United States senators who owned slaves